Katherine Kelly may refer to:
Katherine Kelly (actress) (born 1979), British actress
Katherine Kelly Lang (born 1961), American actress
Kate Kelly (sculptor) (1882–1964), American/Hawaiian sculptor
Katherine C. Kelly (1924–2011), civil rights activist
Kathryn Kelly (1904–1985), American criminal

See also
Kate Kelly (disambiguation)